Lasiopetalum drummondii is a species of flowering plant in the family Malvaceae and is endemic to the south-west of Western Australia. It is an erect, slender shrub with many densely hairy stems, egg-shaped or oblong leaves and white, pink and red flowers.

Description

Taxonomy
Lasiopetalum drummondii was first formally described in 1863 by George Bentham in Flora Australiensis from specimens collected by James Drummond. The specific epithet (drummondii) honours the collector of the type specimen.

Distribution and habitat
This lasiopetalum grows in sandy soil in low woodland, shrubland or heath from near Dongara and Lesueur National Park to south of Cataby in the Geraldton Sandplains and Swan Coastal Plain biogeographic regions of south-western Western Australia.

Conservation status
Lasiopetalum drummondii is listed as "not threatened" by the Department of Biodiversity, Conservation and Attractions.

References

drummondii
Malvales of Australia
Flora of Western Australia
Plants described in 1863
Taxa named by George Bentham